The Jagged Rocks are a group of rocks lying near the center of Hut Cove in the eastern part of Hope Bay, at the northeast end of the Antarctic Peninsula. First charted in 1903 by a party under J. Gunner Andersson of the Swedish Antarctic Expedition, they were given this descriptive name by the Falkland Islands Dependencies Survey in 1945.

References

Rock formations of the Trinity Peninsula